This is a list of governorates of the Russian Empire (pre-1918 spelling: губернія, post-1918 spelling: губерния) established between the administrative reform of 1708 and the establishment of the Kholm Governorate in 1912 (inclusive).

Some of these governorates persisted into the Soviet era (renamed oblasts during the 1920s), while others were subdivided further as part of the policy of "unbundling" (разукрупнение, razukrupneniye) of the 1930s. During the partitions of Poland (in the 1780s), many governorates were replaced with viceroyalties, but later (before the 1800s) were reverted to governorates.

List of governorates

Grand Duchy of Finland
Governorates of the Grand Duchy of Finland during 1831–1917:
 Åbo och Björneborg Governorate
 Kuopio Governorate
 Nikolaistad Governorate
 Nyland Governorate
 St. Michel Governorate
 Tavastehus Governorate
 Uleåborg Governorate
 Viborg Governorate

See also
History of the administrative division of Russia
 Subdivisions of the Soviet Union
 Federal subjects of Russia

References

Notes

Sources
Сергей Тархов. "Изменение административно-территориального деления России в XIII-XX вв.". "Логос", 2005, No. 1.  (Sergey Tarkhov. Changes of the Administrative-Territorial Structure of Russia in the 13th–20th centuries).

Further reading

 
  (+ via Hathi Trust)